The 2007 Second Division Football Tournament was the 2nd edition of the Second Division Football Tournament in the Maldives. Club All Youth Linkage won the tournament after defeating Vyansa on penalties.

Final

References

External links
 Draw for Sikaada & BG Haveeru Online (DHIVEHI)

Maldivian Second Division Football Tournament seasons
Maldives
Maldives
2